Royal Eagles was a South African football club based in Maritzburg, KwaZulu Natal playing in the National First Division.

Current squad
.

References

External links
 

 
Association football clubs established in 2014
Soccer clubs in South Africa
SAFA Second Division clubs
National First Division clubs
2014 establishments in South Africa